Bedford is a city located in the Estrie region of southern Quebec, Canada. The population as of the Canada 2011 Census was 2,684. This small community is just an hour's drive from larger cities such as Burlington and Montreal.

History 
The first settlers arrived in 1812.

Origin of the name 
The name "Bedford" could have been given by Loyalists who knew of several Bedfords back in the former American colonies.  The name could also have been a tribute to Lord John Russell, who was the fourth Duke of Bedford (1710–1771), an English politician and Secretary of State (1748–1751), and governor general of Ireland from 1756 to 1761.

Geography 
Bedford is part of Brome-Missisquoi Regional County Municipality, in the administrative region of Estrie.

Seated in the Saint-Lawrence lowlands, at the beginning of the steppe leading to the Appalachian Mountains, the town is separated into north and south parts by the Pike River (Rivière aux Brochets).

Demographics 

Parishes 
Roman Catholic Church
Saint Mitchels Parish
Le frontere Perish
The Anglican Parish of Bedford, Philipsburg and Farnham
United Church

Activities 
Every year since 1828, at the beginning of August, the town holds its annual fair, the oldest of its kind in Quebec and the second oldest in Canada. One can figure skate, or play hockey or curling, at the Centre sportif.
Every year since 1969, Bedford has held a PeeWee hockey exchange with Kensington, PEI.

Schools 
École primaire et secondaire Monseigneur-Desranleau (French)
École primaire du Premier Envol (French)
Butler Elementary (English 1-7)

Notable people
 Georges Thurston (1951–2007) a.k.a. Boule Noire, R&B singer for 30 years.
 Pierre Paradis (1950-), Member of National Assembly of Quebec for 25 years and former Cabinet Minister
 Marcellus Gilmore Edson (1849-1940), chemist who invented peanut butter.

See also
 List of cities in Quebec

References

External links 

 Official web site

Cities and towns in Quebec
Incorporated places in Brome-Missisquoi Regional County Municipality